Ilya Vyacheslavovich Slepov (born 10 April 1981 in Moscow) is a Russian triathlete and orienteer, Master of Sports of Russia in orienteering. He is also known as the founder and co-owner of Laboratoriya Bega (RunLab) sports shops chain and many different sports equipment enterprises.

Biography 
Ilya Slepov was born on 10 April 1981 in Moscow; the parents are Vyacheslav Sergeevich Slepov (born 15 March 1950, an engineer) and Elena Ivanovna Slepova (born 25 December 1952). He finished School No. 411 in 1998, he studied at the MSU Faculty of Geography in 1998-2003. He continued his orienteering sports career during his studies. He resides in Novogireyevo District, Moscow.

Sports career 
Slepov was fond of running and orienteering in his childhood. He began orienteering in SDYUSHOR School No. 54, the first coach was I.A.Tyurina. His next coaches were N.V.Morosanova, N.A.Valuyev and S.V.Balandinsky. In May 1991 he debuted at orienteering competitions and got to the 2nd place. His first diploma for 3rd place was won at Rubezh Slavy competitions in 1989. He won his first medal of Russian Championship in 2000, it was silver medal of final stage in Perm.

In 2005 Slepov debuted in rogaine at Russian Championship in Nizhny Novgorod. He was a member of Russia national orienteering team in 2006-2007 and participated in several stages of World Cup. Since 2009 he has been participating in amateur competitions of triathlon (including Ironman).

Slepov is known as:
 Multiple champion and medalist of Russian triathlon, marathon and multi-sports races (IRONSTAR), Moscow Triathlon, Skolkovo Mile, Grom, TITAN)
 Winner and medalist of Ironman 70.3 international triathlon races.
 Bronze medalist of 2013 European Winter Triathlon Championships
 Participant of several climbings.

Honours 
 2000:
  Russian Junior Orienteering Championship (Nizhny Novgorod)
 2001:
  Russian Sports Clubs and Physical Education Clubs Championship — Relay
 2005:
  Russian Mounting Bike Orienteering Cup (Smolensk)
  Russian Rogaine Championship — Male + Female (Nizhny Novgorod)
 2006:
  Russian Orienteering Cup — All-Around winner of all 4 days (Togliatti)
  Russian Rogaine Championship — Male + Female (Nizhny Novgorod)

Business activity 
Slepov was involved in business in 2001 when he began a Russian dealer of Polar pulsemeters. Slepov and Gavrilov contacted with Siliconcoach software developers team from New Zealand and began new enterprise founding. In September 2012 first RunLab (Laboratoriya Bega) shop was opened in Moscow, and soon RunLab developed its own software for running style video analysing. This is one of the first Russian sports shops chains which offers equipment for running. New shops were opened in Moscow and St. Petersburg in 2016. The revenue at the end of 2013 was27 mln. rubles and total profit was 5 mln. rubles; in 2016 the results were 145 mln. rubles and 20 mln. rubles relatively. RunLab cooperates with Asics, Brooks, Saucony, Salomon, Mizuno brands and worldwide Nike and Adidas trademarks. Test Your Run technology which helps to choose sports shoes according to sportsman feet movement is borrowed by many Adidas shops.

References

Sources

Profiles 
 
 Statistics at Tristats.ru

Business activity 
 Laboratoriya Bega (RunLab) official site 
 Mir Sporta official site 

1981 births
Living people
Russian orienteers
Male orienteers
Foot orienteers
Russian male triathletes
Russian businesspeople  in retailing
Moscow State University alumni